23 Skidoo is a 1964 short experimental black-and-white film directed by Julian Biggs and produced by the National Film Board of Canada.

Synopsis
Its central images are "eerie" and "disturbing" scenes of downtown Montreal devoid of people. The film offers no explanation for what happened to the people until a scene in a newsroom where we glimpse a never-completed report about the explosion of the first neutron bomb.

Accolades
In 1965, the film was nominated for a BAFTA Award for Best Short Film. Also at the 1965 BAFTAs, it was nominated for the United Nations Award for "the best Film embodying one or more of the principles of the United Nations Charter in 1965" (Dr. Strangelove won the award). 23 Skidoo won "Special Mention" in the international competition at the 1965 Cracow Film Festival that year.

References
Notes

See also
Arthur Lipsett - another NFB filmmaker similar in content
The Cold War

External links
 
 

1960s avant-garde and experimental films
1960s science fiction films
1964 short films
Canadian black-and-white films
National Film Board of Canada short films
Quebec films
Canadian post-apocalyptic films
Canadian avant-garde and experimental short films
Films shot in Montreal
Films without speech
1960s Canadian films